Palorus is a genus of darkling beetles in the family Tenebrionidae. There are at least 4 described species in Palorus.

Species
 Palorus foveicollis Blair, 1930
 Palorus ratzeburgi (Wissmann, 1848)
 Palorus ratzeburgii (Wissmann, 1848) (small-eyed flour beetle)
 Palorus subdepressus (Wollaston, 1864) (depressed flour beetle)

References

Further reading

 Arnett, R.H. Jr., M. C. Thomas, P. E. Skelley and J. H. Frank. (eds.). (2002). American Beetles, Volume II: Polyphaga: Scarabaeoidea through Curculionoidea. CRC Press LLC, Boca Raton, FL.
 
 Richard E. White. (1983). Peterson Field Guides: Beetles. Houghton Mifflin Company.

Tenebrioninae